Mabel Lee is a translator of the works of Nobel Prize-winning author Gao Xingjian.  She has taught Asian studies at the University of Sydney and is one of Australia's leading authorities on Chinese cultural affairs. Lee was a professor of South-East Asian Studies at Sydney University and had already begun translation of the poems of Chinese writer, Yang Lian when she met Gao Xingjian, in Paris in 1991. After that meeting, Lee offered to translate Soul Mountain, a project which took seven years, and an additional two to find a publisher for the book in Australia. Following publication, Gao Xingjian became the first Chinese to win a Nobel Prize in Literature.

Lee's translation won the 2001 NSW Premier's Translation Prize despite criticism about the book, and her translation's quality. After her retirement from teaching, she translated another of Gao's novels, One Man's Bible, as well as a short-story collection and a book of his essays.

In 2012 Lee's translation of Gao Xingjian: Aesthetics and Creation was published by Cambria Press. The book is part of the Cambria Sinophone World Series headed by Victor H. Mair.

References

Australian people of Chinese descent
Linguists from Australia
Women linguists
Chinese–English translators
Living people
Year of birth missing (living people)